William Ross Bednar (born June 13, 2000) is an American professional baseball pitcher in the San Francisco Giants organization. He played college baseball for the Mississippi State Bulldogs.

Amateur career
Bednar attended Mars Area High School in Mars, Pennsylvania, where he played baseball under his father, Andy. He originally committed to play college baseball at Ohio State University, but later switched his commitment to Mississippi State University. As a sophomore in 2017, he spent a majority of the season catching, and pitched only around 15 innings. In 2018, as a junior, he switched to pitching full time and went 8–0 with a 0.64 ERA and 120 strikeouts over 66 innings. As a senior in 2019, his playing time was limited due to a shoulder issue. Bednar was not selected in the 2019 Major League Baseball draft, and thus enrolled at Mississippi State.

In 2020, Bednar's freshman year at Mississippi State, he pitched  innings, striking out 23 and compiling a 1.76 ERA before the remainder of the season was cancelled due to the COVID-19 pandemic. As a sophomore in 2021, he moved into the starting rotation, going 7–1 with a 3.17 ERA and 109 strikeouts over 15 games (12 starts) for the regular season. He was named to the Newcomer All-SEC Team. During game three of the 2021 College World Series, Bednar pitched six innings in which he allowed three walks and zero hits while striking out four, subsequently being named the College World Series Most Outstanding Player as Mississippi State won their first ever College World Series. For the 2021 College World Series, Bednar pitched to a 1.47 ERA over  innings.

Professional career
Bednar was selected by the San Francisco Giants in the first round with the 14th overall selection of the 2021 Major League Baseball draft. He signed for $3.65 million. He made his professional debut with the Rookie-level Arizona Complex League Giants, and was promoted to the San Jose Giants of the Low-A West after two appearances. He pitched a total of seven innings for the season, striking out six while allow one earned run.

Bednar opened the 2022 season ranked as San Francisco's fourth best prospect. He returned to San Jose to begin the season. In mid-June, he was placed on the injured list with a back injury and missed the remainder of the season. Over 12 starts for the season, he went 1–3 with a 4.19 ERA, 51 strikeouts, and 22 walks over 43 innings. He was selected to play in the Arizona Fall League for the Scottsdale Scorpions after the season.

Personal life
Bednar's older brother, David, plays for the Pittsburgh Pirates.

References

External links

Mississippi State Bulldogs bio

2000 births
Living people
Baseball pitchers
Baseball players from Pittsburgh
College World Series Most Outstanding Player Award winners
Mississippi State Bulldogs baseball players
Arizona Complex League Giants players
San Jose Giants players